Hezar Khani (also Romanized as Hezār Khānī) is a village in Fash Rural District, in the Central District of Kangavar County, Kermanshah Province, Iran. At the 2006 census, its population was 151, in 35 families.

References 

Populated places in Kangavar County